Arosa Lenzerheide is a ski area located in Arosa, Lenzerheide, Valbella, Parpan and Churwalden, Graubünden/Switzerland. It originated 2013/14 by connecting the existing ski areas of Arosa and Lenzerheide. With a total of 225 kilometers (140 miles) of ski slopes and 43 cable cars it is the largest contiguous ski area in Graubünden.

Location and description 
Arosa Lenzerheide is located in northern and central Grisons. It extends from the innermost Schanfigg via Urdental to the neighboring western valley with Lenzerheide, Parpan–Valbella and Churwalden. Outstanding summits with aerial tramways and panoramic restaurants are the Weisshorn and the Parpaner Rothorn which also marks the highest point of the ski area. 60 per cent of the slopes are groomed with artificial snow. 

In the summer season the region is a popular hiking and mountain biking resort.

Arosa and Lenzerheide are connected by a cable car called «Urdenbahn». This aerial tramway was built in 2013 and is located between the Arosa Hörnli and the Urdenfürggli on the Lenzerheide side. The ski resort is operated mainly by Arosa Bergbahnen and Lenzerheide Bergbahnen.

Ski lifts 
A total of 43 ski lifts operate in Arosa Lenzerheide: 14 in Arosa, 12 in Lenzerheide east side (incl. Urdenbahn and chairlift Obertor), 13 in Lenzerheide west side (incl. chairlift Obertor) and 4 in Churwalden. There are 4 aerial tramways, 4 gondola lifts, 18 chair lifts (17 detachables) and 15 T-bars/button lifts:

Urdenbahn (Hörnli–Urdenfürggli cable car) 
The centrepiece of the resort compound is the Urdenbahn cable car, built and operated by the Arosa Bergbahnen company.

The Austrian-Swiss cableway manufacturer Steurer Seilbahnen created two parallel single-track twin-cable aerial ropeways which manage with a single rope span without pylons. There are two rope loops, the return of the ropes is in each case on the track of the other path. For stabilizing the ropes 17 large supporting cable tabs are used. Two glazed Kuechler design cabins from Gangloff are installed with six automatic doors and a capacity of 150 people each. The hourly transportation capacity is 1,700 persons per direction. At low ridership or technical restrictions the Urdenbahn can be operated with just one car. The emergency passenger evacuating concept includes the use of winches between the two cabins.

Technical specifications 
 Runway length: 
 East station Arosa:  asl
 West station Lenzerheide:  asl
 Altitude difference: 
 Capacity/payload per cabin: 150 + 1 Pers. / 
 Dimension suspension ropes: 
 Dimension pull ropes: 
 Average power: 
 Maximum travelling speed: 
 Average travel time: 5 minutes (incl. waiting time in cabin)
 Installed carrying capacity: 2 × 850 Pers./h

Ski schools 
Arosa Lenzerheide has a variety of ski schools. Each have several different classes, based on age and ability.

Recent investments and notable investment projects 
In 2016 snowmaking facilities were installed between Parpan and Churwalden as well as between Pradaschier and Churwalden.

In 2017 the mountain restaurant 'Motta' was rebuilt.

In 2019 the chairlift 'Brüggerhorn' was rebuilt.

In 2020 snowmaking facilities were installed along the 'Black Diamond Slope'.

In 2021 the chairlift 'Weisshorn Speed' was equipped with new chairs and new transport facilities for mountain bikes.

See also 
 Swiss Alps 
 List of ski areas and resorts in Switzerland

References

External links 

 Official website of Arosa Lenzerheide
 YouTube-channel displaying all ropeways in Arosa Lenzerheide

Ski areas in Switzerland
Arosa
Tourist attractions in Graubünden
Buildings and structures in Graubünden
2013 establishments in Switzerland